Merine is a town and commune in Sidi Bel Abbès Province in northwestern Algeria.

Geography
The municipality is composed by the town of Merine and the village of Amelza. It borders with Oued Sefioun, Oued Taourira, Tafissour, Teghalimet, Telagh and Youb (in Saïda Province).

References

Communes of Sidi Bel Abbès Province